Appetite for Disctruction is the debut studio album by the German IDM duo Funkstörung. It was released on Studio !K7 on April 25, 2000.

Background
In 1999, Funkstörung received international critical praise with Additional Productions, which included remixes for acts like Björk and Wu-Tang Clan. In the next year, the duo released the debut studio album, Appetite for Disctruction, on Studio !K7. Five years in the making, it features vocal contributions from MC Triple H and singers Greenwood and Carin.

Critical reception
Brian Musich of AllMusic gave the album 4.5 stars out of 5, saying, "Funkstörung creates an aural world of maddeningly complex soundscapes." CMJ New Music Report called it "the music Afrika Bambaataa might have created were he inspired by Autechre instead of Kraftwerk."

Track listing

References

External links
 

2000 debut albums
Funkstörung albums
Studio !K7 albums